The middle pharyngeal constrictor is a fan-shaped muscle located in the neck. It is one of three pharyngeal constrictor muscles. It is smaller than the inferior pharyngeal constrictor muscle.

The middle pharyngeal constrictor originates from the greater cornu and lesser cornu of the hyoid bone, and the stylohyoid ligament. It inserts onto the pharyngeal raphe. It is innervated by a branch of the vagus nerve through the pharyngeal plexus. It acts to propel a bolus downwards along the pharynx towards the esophagus, facilitating swallowing.

Structure
The fibers diverge from their origin: the lower ones descend beneath the constrictor inferior, the middle fibers pass transversely, and the upper fibers ascend and overlap the constrictor superior.

Origin 
The middle pharyngeal constrictor arises from the whole length of the upper border of the greater cornu of the hyoid bone, the lesser cornu of the hyoid bone, and from the stylohyoid ligament.

Insertion 
The middle pharyngeal constrictor inserts posteriorly into the pharyngeal raphe, blending with its contralateral partner at the midline.

Innervation 
Similarly to the superior and inferior pharyngeal constrictor muscles, it is innervated by a branch of the vagus nerve through the pharyngeal plexus.

Function
As soon as the bolus of food is received in the pharynx, the elevator muscles relax, the pharynx descends, and the constrictors contract upon the bolus, and convey it downward into the esophagus. They also have respiratory mechanical effects.

Additional images

References

Further reading
Its role in speech: 
Its role in Hyoid bone syndrome:

External links
 

Muscles of the head and neck
Pharynx